David H. Chafey Jr. is a business executive and the current chairman of the board of the Puerto Rico Government Development Bank. Before the GDB, Chafey was the Chief Operating Officer of Popular, Inc. and former President of Banco Popular de Puerto Rico.  Chafey is a member of the Caribbean Business Hall of Fame in recognition of him being named one of Puerto Rico's Top Ten Business Leaders for the fifth year in a row in 2008.

Career
Chafey began his career at Banco Popular in 1980 as vice president of the Investment Division and became senior vice president of the Investment Group in 1985. He was appointed CFO in 1990, in charge of the Financial Management Group, senior executive vice president in charge of Retail Banking Group in 1995, and president of Banco Popular de Puerto Rico in 2004.  In 2009, he was appointed president and chief operating officer of Popular, Inc.

Education
Chafey received his bachelor's degree in finance from the Fairfield University Dolan School of Business and master of business administration from the New York University Stern School of Business.

See also
List of Puerto Ricans

References

External links
Fairfield University Alumni Professional Achievement Award
Puerto Rico's Top Business Leaders: David H. Chafey Jr.

Fairfield University Dolan School of Business alumni
Fairfield University alumni
Puerto Rican businesspeople
Living people
New York University Stern School of Business alumni
American chief operating officers
American chief executives
American chief financial officers
Year of birth missing (living people)